The nations of the European Union issue commemorative coins in various denominations. These include:

 Euro gold and silver commemorative coins of various face values.
 €2 commemorative coins.